Mississippi Brilla is an amateur American soccer club based in Clinton, Mississippi, United States. Founded in 2006, the team plays in USL League Two. The team's colors are sky blue, navy and white.

Brilla is associated with Brilla Soccer Ministries, an organization which undertakes sports ministry to share Christianity through the sport. The club’s name is derived from the Spanish word for "shine", and references the biblical passage Matthew 5:16 which says "Therefore, let your light so shine before men that they may see your good works and glorify your Father who is in heaven."

Although the club initially finished in the middle of the standings their first couple of years, Brilla has become one of the strongest PDL franchises in the Southeast on the pitch, winning their division regular season title in 2009, 2010, 2011, 2015, and 2021. In 2017, the club had their best showing in the playoffs, winning the Southern Conference Championship and advancing to the PDL Semi-finals.

History

Mississippi Brilla entered the PDL in 2007 to a great deal of fanfare, as the first soccer franchise in Mississippi since the demise of the Jackson Chargers in 1999. Under head coach Dave Dixon, Brilla tied their first game 1-1 at home to New Orleans Shell Shockers in front of over 1,000 fans (with the honor of the first goal in franchise history going to James Gledhill), and although the average attendance remained high throughout the season, the on-field results were not quite as impressive. Brilla won their first game next time out, 1-0 over DFW Tornados, but then failed to register a victory in their next four games. In the end, too many ties caused Brilla's downfall - 5 on the season - and despite some impressive results, including a 5-1 hammering of Baton Rouge Capitals in June and 5-0 demolition of Nashville Metros in July, it was not quite enough to make the playoffs, and they eventually finished their freshman year fourth behind divisional (and eventual national) champions Laredo Heat. James Gledhill was the team's top scorer, with six goals, while Chris Rash and Tripp Harkins led the assists stats with three apiece.

Brilla's second season in the PDL was pretty much on an equal footing with their first. With new head coach Steve DeCou at the helm, attendances remained high, often topping 900 fans per game, and the team enjoyed a number of exciting victories, including a hard-fought 2-0 win over the eventual divisional champions Austin Aztex U23, a 2-1 come-from-behind victory over New Orleans Shell Shockers in mid-June, and a spectacular 6-2 final day victory at home against Houston Leones in which Tripp Harkins scored a brace. As was the case in 2007, however, Brilla's downfall was a lack of consistency, and their inability to string a series of results together to gain momentum: their longest streak was a 5-game run in late June and early which included three wins and two ties, including the aforementioned victory over New Orleans. Mississippi ended the season in 4th place in the Mid South Division, just four points out of the playoffs, and with plenty to build on in 2009. Phillip Buffington was the team's most prolific goalscorer, with 8 for the season.

In 2009 Brilla had its most successful start in team history.  Brilla qualified for the U.S. Open Cup for the first time in franchise history by going undefeated in their first four games, winning three and drawing one.

Players and staff

Current roster
As of June 2019.

Head coach
  Luke Stanford (2022-present)

Notable players
This list of notable players comprises players who have gone on to play professional soccer after playing for the team in the Premier Development League, or those who previously played professionally before joining the team.

  Emir Alihodžić
  Michael Azira
  Kharlton Belmar
  Richard Bryan
  Gui Brandao
  Phillip Buffington
  Kyle Clinton
  Kyle Culbertson
  Craig Demmin
  Dwyane Demmin
  Richard Dixon
  Devon Fisher
  Billy Forbes
  Kaelon Fox
  J. J. Greer
  Kellen Gulley
  Chakib Hocine
  Willie Hunt
  Oscar Jimenez
  Alec Kann
  Angelo Kelly-Rosales
  Macauley King
  Jake Leeker
  David Lilly
  Napo Matsoso
  Brendan Moore
  Debola Ogunseye
  Lucas Paulini
  Kyle Segebart
  Jordan Skelton
  Bryce Taylor
  Thomas Vancaeyezeele

Former Head Coaches
  Mark McKeever (2015-2018)
  Drew Courtney (2013-2014)
  Dave Dixon (2007, 2009–2012)
  Steve DeCou (2008)

Year-by-year

Honors
 USL PDL Southeast Division Champions 2009
 USL PDL Southeast Division Champions 2010
 USL PDL Southeast Division Champions 2011
 USL PDL Mid South Division Champions 2015
 USL PDL Southern Conference Champions 2017
 USL League Two Mid South Division Champions 2021

Stadium
 Robert P. Longabaugh Field; Mississippi College; Clinton, Mississippi (2007-2009)
 Harper Davis Stadium; Millsaps College; Jackson, Mississippi (2007, 2010–2012)
 M&F Bank Stadium (Freedom Ridge Park); Ridgeland, Mississippi (2 games in 2008-2009)
 Traceway Park, Clinton, Mississippi (4 games in 2015, 2016)
 Arrow Field at Clinton High School; Clinton, Mississippi (3 games in 2008-2010, 2013–2015, 2017-present)

Supporters
The Mississippi Brilla supporter club is The Blue Battalion, founded in 2015.  The Battalion tailgate before each home game and bring passion and noise to match days. Each home game the group selects their player of the game, who signs the large Blue Battalion flag.

Broadcasts
Each Mississippi Brilla home game is broadcast live on Eleven Sports and also kept there for on demand viewing.

References

External links

Mississippi Brilla FC at USL League Two

Association football clubs established in 2006
USL League Two teams
Soccer clubs in Mississippi
Hinds County, Mississippi
2006 establishments in Mississippi
Christian sports organizations